Oakwood is a neighborhood of Hannibal, Missouri, United States.

Oakwood was named for a grove of oak trees near the original site.

The community contains Oakwood Elementary School.

References

Hannibal, Missouri
Neighborhoods in Missouri